Louis Eugene Faucher (8 October 1874 - 30 March 1964) was a French general.

Faucher was graduate of École Polytechnique, and his abilities earned him a professorship of general tactics and engineering at the School of Applied Artillery in Fontainebleau, a position he held from 1901 to 1905. He joined the war college at the École Militaire and from 1910 and 1914 pursued a career in Central Administration at the Ministry of Defense.

During the Interwar period he was head of the French military mission in Czechoslovakia from 1926 to 1938. After the Franco-British ultimatum to the Czechoslovak government, he presented his resignation to the French government on 23 September 1938, but remained in Czechoslovakia. During World War II, Faucher was head of Region B (Southwest) of the Armée secrète, and was arrested by the Gestapo in 1944. Faucher remained incarcerated until the end of the war.

Faucher remained in Czechoslovakia after the war's end, and tried to revive the friendship between France and Czechoslovak, but was forced to abandon his mission after February 1948, when the Communist Party of Czechoslovakia overthrew the government in a coup d'état.  Thereafter, Faucher spent time in Prague helping exiles.

Faucher died in 1964; he was honored by the president of the Association of Czechoslovak Volunteers in France.

References

External links
 

French generals
1874 births
1964 deaths